Peter Henry St George-Hyslop, OC, FRS, FRSC, FRCPC, (born July 10, 1953) is a British and Canadian medical scientist, neurologist and molecular geneticist who is known for his research into neurodegenerative diseases. St George-Hyslop is one of the most cited authors in the field of Alzheimer's disease research. He has identified a number of key genes that are responsible for nerve cell degeneration and early-onset forms of Alzheimer's disease. These include the discovery of the presenilins (PSEN1 and PSEN2), Nicastrin, and SORL1 genes. Presenilin mutations are the most common cause of familiar Alzheimer's disease. St George-Hyslop also co-led the discovery of the gene for the amyloid precursor protein.

St George-Hyslop's father, Noel St George Hyslop was a renowned scientist who worked on Foot and Mouth Disease virus.

Since 2007 St George-Hyslop has headed an Alzheimer's disease research program as Professor of Experimental Neuroscience at the University of Cambridge.

Educated at Wellington School, Wellington, Somerset, UK, St George-Hyslop completed his medical training in Canada, graduating with the MD degree in 1976, and then pursuing post-doctoral research in internal medicine and neurology at the University of Toronto and Harvard Medical School. He served his first appointment at Harvard's Massachusetts General Hospital, where he taught molecular genetics and neurology from 1987 to 1991. He was appointed to the University of Toronto in 1991, and since 2003 has held the university's highest rank of University Professor. From 1995 to 2018, St George-Hyslop served as the director of the Tanz Centre for Research in Neurodegenerative Diseases at the University of Toronto Faculty of Medicine. In 2007 St George-Hyslop was appointed Professor of Experimental Neuroscience at the University of Cambridge.

He was awarded the Metlife Foundation Award for Medical Research in Alzheimer's Disease in 1987, the Howard Hughes Medical Institute International Scholar Award in 1997 and 2002, the Gold Medal in Medicine from the Royal College of Physicians of Canada in 1994, the Michael Smith Award from the Canadian Institutes of Health Research in 1997 and the Dan David Prize in 2014. He is a member of the American Society for Clinical Investigation, a fellow of the Royal Society of London and the Royal Society of Canada, and a Foreign Member to the Institute of Medicine of the United States National Academies. He was appointed Officer of the Order of Canada in 2018.

References

Further reading
Science.ca profile
Profile at the University Health Network

1953 births
Academics of the University of Cambridge
Harvard Medical School faculty
Academic staff of the University of Toronto
Members of the United States National Academy of Sciences
Fellows of the Royal Society
Fellows of the Royal Society of Canada
Living people
Officers of the Order of Canada
People educated at Wellington School, Somerset
British medical researchers
Canadian medical researchers
British neurologists
Canadian neurologists
British geneticists
Canadian geneticists
Members of the National Academy of Medicine